Dunne Foxe Island is one of the Canadian arctic islands in Nunavut, Canada within western Hudson Bay.

The island was named on July 30, 1631, by Arctic explorer, Captain Luke Foxe.

References

Islands of Hudson Bay
Uninhabited islands of Kivalliq Region